The Battle of Takusa was a short military engagement fought on 12 April 1853 between the forces of Kassa Hailu, future Emperor of Ethiopia, and an alliance of several rival warlords. The forces of Kassa's enemies were led by Dejazmach Birru Aligaz and Samuel Birhanu, who was reinforced by troops sent to him by Wube Haile Maryam under the command of his son, Gwangul Wube.

According to Sven Rubenson, this battle is famous "as the battle in which he [Kassa] fought four dejazmaches and killed two, Dejazmach Birru Aligaz and Belew." However, Harold G. Marcus states that Kassa defeated five Dejazmaches, and that Birru was not killed in this battle, but escaped and was captured in May 1854, to remain in captivity for the next 14 years.

References

Battles involving Ethiopia
Battles of the Zemene Mesafint
1853 in Ethiopia
Conflicts in 1853
April 1853 events